Norman Wood may refer to:

Norman Wood (golfer) (born 1947), Scottish golfer
Norman Wood (badminton), English badminton player
Norman Wood (footballer, born 1889) (1889–1916), English footballer
Norman Wood (footballer, born 1932), English footballer for Sunderland
Norman Wood (politician) (1891–1988), member of the Pennsylvania House of Representatives

See also
Norman Woods (born 1936), New Zealand cricketer
Norman H. Woods (died 1987), North American golf course architect